Established in 1963, Bagmari-Maniktala Government Sponsored Higher Secondary School is a school in north Kolkata, West Bengal, India. It is also known as Bagmari-Manicktala Govt Sponsored High School or Bagmari-Manicktala Govt Sponsd High School or BMGS High School. It is at 1, Bagmari Lane, Kolkata-700054.

It is one of the creations of Kolkata Improvement Trust. For this reason the school is also known as CIT School. It is affiliated to the West Bengal Board of Secondary Education. The school has nearly 1,000 students.

Gallery

References
 Bagmari-Maniktala Govt Spon High School in the website of West Bengal Board of Secondary Education. The index number of the school is A2-010.
 Information on the school

External links

 

High schools and secondary schools in Kolkata
Educational institutions established in 1963
1963 establishments in West Bengal